The greater stripe-backed shrew or stripe-backed shrew (Sorex cylindricauda) is a species of mammal in the family Soricidae. It is endemic to China.

References

Sources

Mammals of China
Sorex
Taxonomy articles created by Polbot
Mammals described in 1872